
The Great Depression was a dramatic, worldwide economic downturn beginning in 1929 and lasting through most of the 1930s.

The Great Depression may also refer to:

By country
 Great Depression in Australia
 Great Depression in Canada
 Great Depression in India
 Great Depression in France
 Great Depression in Latin America
 Great Depression in the Netherlands
 Great Depression in Romania
 Great Depression in the United Kingdom
 Great Depression in the United States

Books
 The Great Depression: America, 1929–1941, an American novel
 The Great Depression (book), a 1990 Canadian history book

Music
 The Great Depression (Common Grackle album), 2010
 The Great Depression (Trigger the Bloodshed album), 2009
 The Great Depression (Blindside album), 2005
 The Great Depression (Defiance, Ohio album), 2006
 The Great Depression (DMX album), 2001
 The Great Depression (As It Is album), 2018
 "The Great Depression", a song by Misery Index from Retaliate
 "The Great Depression" a song by Raunchy from A Discord Electric
 "Great Depression", a song by Soulfly from Omen

See also 
 Financial crisis of 2007–08, a severe worldwide economic crisis driven by real estate conditions and risky ventures in the U.S.
 Great Recession, the marked general economic decline that affected many countries from 2007 to 2009
 Great Slump (disambiguation)
 The Long Depression, an  1873–1896 economic recession formerly known as the Great Depression
 Second Great Depression (disambiguation)